Hans Posthumus (10 March 1947 – 15 February 2016) was a Dutch professional footballer who played as a striker.

Career
Born in Harderwijk, he played for VVOG, Wageningen, Feyenoord, Mechelen, Lierse and NEC. While with Lierse he was the top-scorer in the Belgian Pro League during the 1975–76 season. He retired from professional football in October 1978, at the age of 31, due to back pain.

References

1947 births
2016 deaths
Dutch footballers
VVOG players
FC Wageningen players
Feyenoord players
K.R.C. Mechelen players
Lierse S.K. players
NEC Nijmegen players
Eerste Divisie players
Eredivisie players
Belgian Pro League players
Association football forwards
Dutch expatriate footballers
Dutch expatriate sportspeople in Belgium
Expatriate footballers in Belgium
People from Harderwijk
Footballers from Gelderland